Naringenin 7-O-methyltransferase (NOMT) (full systematic name S-adenosyl-L-methionine:(2S)-5,7,4'-trihydroxyflavanone 7-O-methyltransferase) is a methyltransferase isolated from rice, which catalyzes the biosynthesis of sakuranetin.

This enzyme catalyses the following chemical reaction:

 S-adenosyl-L-methionine + (2S)-naringenin  S-adenosyl-L-homocysteine + (2S)-sakuranetin

While the enzyme is not present in healthy rice leaves, it can be induced by treatment with ultraviolet radiation, jasmonic acid and copper chloride.

References

External links 
 

EC 2.1.1